SCEE may refer to:
Sony Computer Entertainment Europe, formerly a subsidiary of Sony, now part of Sony Interactive Entertainment
School of Civil and Environmental Engineering, a constituent college of the National University of Sciences and Technology, Pakistan